Te Waihorotiu railway station, also known as Aotea railway station, is an under construction underground railway station in Auckland, New Zealand. It is due to open in 2024 as part of the City Rail Link project. It is expected to become the busiest rail station in New Zealand when opened, and will serve the Aotea Centre, Auckland Town Hall and Skycity Auckland.

Layout
Te Waihorotiu station will be located 15 metres underground, built between Albert Street, Wellesley Street, Victoria Street and Bledisloe Lane. Construction commenced in September 2019.

Construction gallery

References

Auckland CBD
Proposed railway stations in New Zealand
Rail transport in Auckland
Railway stations in New Zealand
Railway stations located underground
Railway stations scheduled to open in 2024